In computational complexity theory, a function problem is a computational problem where a single output (of a total function) is expected for every input, but the output is more complex than that of a decision problem. For function problems, the output is not simply 'yes' or 'no'.

Formal definition 
A functional problem  is defined as a relation  over strings of an arbitrary alphabet :

 

An algorithm solves  if for every input  such that there exists a  satisfying , the algorithm produces one such .

Examples 
A well-known function problem is given by the Functional Boolean Satisfiability Problem, FSAT for short. The problem, which is closely related to the SAT decision problem, can be formulated as follows:

In this case the relation  is given by tuples of suitably encoded boolean formulas and satisfying assignments.
While a SAT algorithm, fed with a formula , only needs to return "unsatisfiable" or "satisfiable", an FSAT algorithm needs to return some satisfying assignment in the latter case.

Other notable examples include the travelling salesman problem, which asks for the route taken by the salesman, and the integer factorization problem, which asks for the list of factors.

Relationship to other complexity classes 
Consider an arbitrary decision problem  in the class NP. By the definition of NP, each problem instance  that is answered 'yes' has a polynomial-size certificate  which serves as a proof for the 'yes' answer.

FNP can be thought of as the function class analogue of NP, in that solutions of FNP problems can be efficiently (i.e., in polynomial time in terms of the length of the input) verified, but not necessarily efficiently found. In contrast, the class FP, which can be thought of as the function class analogue of P, consists of function problems whose solutions can be found in polynomial time.

Self-reducibility 
Observe that the problem FSAT introduced above can be solved using only polynomially many calls to a subroutine which decides the SAT problem: An algorithm can first ask whether the formula  is satisfiable. After that the algorithm can fix variable  to TRUE and ask again. If the resulting formula is still satisfiable the algorithm keeps  fixed to TRUE and continues to fix , otherwise it decides that  has to be FALSE and continues. Thus, FSAT is solvable in polynomial time using an oracle deciding SAT. In general, a problem in NP is called self-reducible if its function variant can be solved in polynomial time using an oracle deciding the original problem. Every NP-complete problem is self-reducible. It is conjectured  that the integer factorization problem is not self-reducible.

Reductions and complete problems 

If  has an -solution, then  has an -solution.

It is therefore possible to define FNP-complete problems analogous to the NP-complete problem:

The complexity class of FNP-complete problems is denoted by FNP-C or FNPC. Hence the problem FSAT is also an FNP-complete problem, and it holds that  if and only if .

Total function problems 
The relation  used to define function problems has the drawback of being incomplete: Not every input  has a counterpart  such that . Therefore the question of computability of proofs is not separated from the question of their existence. To overcome this problem it is convenient to consider the restriction of function problems to total relations yielding the class TFNP as a subclass of FNP. This class contains problems such as the computation of pure Nash equilibria in certain strategic games where a solution is guaranteed to exist. In addition, if TFNP contains any FNP-complete problem it follows that .

See also
Decision problem
Search problem
Counting problem (complexity)
Optimization problem

References

 Raymond Greenlaw, H. James Hoover, Fundamentals of the theory of computation: principles and practice, Morgan Kaufmann, 1998, p. 45-51
 Elaine Rich, Automata, computability and complexity: theory and applications, Prentice Hall, 2008, section 28.10 "The problem classes FP and FNP", pp. 689–694

Computational problems